Illinois is an American indie rock band from Bucks County, Pennsylvania, fronted by Chris Archibald (vocals, guitar, banjo, keyboard). The other members of the band are Martin Hoeger (bass guitar, vocals), John Paul Kuyper (drums), Jason Buzolits (keyboard, synthesizer, guitar), Andrew Lee (guitar) and Matt Thieroff (guitar, percussion). The band is occasionally accompanied on stage by Dee Jay Skipmode (turntables). The band has released three albums and two EPs.

History
Illinois self-released their first EP, Revenge of Some Kid in 2006. and, in early 2007, Ace Fu Records signed the group after hearing it. Illinois released What the Hell Do I Know? on Ace Fu later that year, attracting comparisons with The White Stripes, The Arcade Fire, Coconut Records, The Morning Benders and Wilco. The group toured and played at SXSW following the release of the EP. Following this, the group toured with The Kooks.  After signing with +1 Records in 2009, Illinois released The Adventures of Kid Catastrophe and subsequently embarked on nationwide tours with Menomena and The Builders and the Butchers.

In July 2011, a new album titled Lemonade Stand was released and was made available to stream on SoundCloud and the band's official website. Some time in 2011, the band left +1 Records and created Rockhampton Records with the band Eastern Conference Champions.

Illinois released their third album, Shine, which was originally due out in October 2012, early in 2015.

The group's song "Nosebleed" was used in the season three episode of Weeds, called, "The Brick Dance". "Hang On" was used on the soundtrack for the video game, NBA 2K10. "Mama-a-Mine" is used in the closing credits for the Comedy Central web series, Delco Proper, which began in July 2015.

Members
Current
Chris Archibald - vocals, guitar, keyboards, banjo
Martin Hoeger - bass guitar, vocals
John-Paul Kuyper - drums
Jason Buzolits - guitar, keyboards, vocals
Andrew Lee - guitar, keyboards, vocals, dancing, magic
Matt Thieroff - guitar, percussion

Previous
Daniel Pawlovich - guitar, keyboards, vocals

Discography
Revenge of Some Kid EP (2006)
What the Hell Do I Know? EP (Ace Fu Records, 2007)
We Were Wrong Single (Ace Fu Records, 2008)
The Adventures of Kid Catastrophe deluxe edition LP (+1 Records, May 5, 2009)
Lemonade Stand LP (self-released, July 21, 2011)
Shine LP (self-released, February 24, 2015)

References

External links
Official website

2006 establishments in Pennsylvania
Indie rock musical groups from Pennsylvania
Musical groups established in 2006